The Battle of the Santa Cruz Islands was fought 25–27 October 1942 in the waters northwest of the Santa Cruz Islands by forces of the Imperial Japanese Navy's (IJN) Combined Fleet and the United States Navy's (USN) Pacific Fleet. The battle resulted from a major Japanese offensive with the goal to drive the US forces from Guadalcanal.

The battle can be viewed as a tactical Japanese victory as they sank the American aircraft carrier  and badly damaged another, while suffering heavy damage in return to carriers Shōkaku and Zuihō. In strategic terms, however, it was ultimately a victory for the United States, as the Japanese failed in their objective to destroy American forces on and around Guadalcanal and suffered significant losses of experienced air crew.

Because the Japanese had the tactical initiative, their forces are listed first.

Forces deployed 
Losses in parentheses

Japanese order of battle

Advance Force 

Vice Admiral Nobutake Kondo in heavy cruiser Atago

 Main Body
 Vice Admiral Kondo
 Cruiser Division 4
 2  heavy cruisers (10 × 8-in. main battery): ,  
 Cruiser Division 5 (Rear Adm. Sentaro Omori in heavy cruiser Myoko)
 1  heavy cruiser (10 × 8-in. main battery): 
 1 Takao-class heavy cruiser (10 × 8-in. main battery):  
 Destroyer Squadron 2 (Rear Adm. Raizo Tanaka in light cruiser Isuzu)
 1  light cruiser (7 × 5.5-in. main battery): 
 2  destroyers (6 × 5-in. main battery): , 

 Carrier Group
 Rear Admiral Kakuji Kakuta in carrier Jun'yō
 Carrier Division 2
 2  fleet carriers
 
 20 Mitsubishi A6M "Zeke" fighters (Lt. Yoshio Shiga)
 17 Aichi D3A "Val" dive bombers (Lt. Masao Yamaguchi†)
   7 Nakajima B5N "Kate" torpedo bombers (Lt. Yoshiaki Irikiin†)
 
 21 Mitsubishi A6M "Zeke" fighters
 18 Aichi D3A "Val" dive bombers
   9 Nakajima B5N "Kate" torpedo bombers
 Screen
 2  destroyers (6 × 5-in. main battery): , 

 Support Group
 Vice Admiral Takeo Kurita in battleship Kongo
 Battleship Division 3
 2  fast battleships (8 × 14-in. main battery): , 
 Screen
 2 Kagerō-class destroyers (6 × 5-in. main battery): ,

Carrier Striking Force 

Vice Admiral Chūichi Nagumo

 Carrier Group
 Vice Admiral Nagumo
  2 fleet carriers
 
 20 Mitsubishi A6M "Zeke" fighters (Lt. Hideki Shingō)
 21 Aichi D3A "Val" dive bombers (Lt. Cmdr. Mamoru Seki†)
 24 Nakajima B5N "Kate" torpedo bombers (Lt. Cmdr. Shigeharu Murata†)
 
 20 Mitsubishi A6M "Zeke" fighters (Lt. Ayao Shirane)
 23 Aichi D3A "Val" dive bombers (Lt. Sadamu Takahashi)
 20 Nakajima B5N "Kate" torpedo bombers (Lt. Shigeichiro Imajuku†)
  1 light carrier
 
 20 Mitsubishi A6M "Zeke" fighters (Lt. Masao Satō)
 6 Nakajima B5N "Kate" torpedo bombers (Lt(jg). Ichiro Tanaka)
 Screen
 1  heavy cruiser (10 × 8-in. main battery): 
 1  destroyer (8 × 4-in. main battery):

Vanguard Group 

Rear Admiral Hiroaki Abe in Hiei
 Battleship Division 11
 2  fast battleships (8 × 14-in. main battery): , 
 Cruiser Division 7 (Rear Adm. Shoji Nishimura)
 1  heavy cruiser (10 × 8-in. main battery):  Cruiser Division 8 (Rear Adm. Chūichi Hara in Tone)
 2  heavy cruisers (8 × 8-in. main battery): ,  Destroyer Squadron 10 (Rear Adm. Susumu Kimura)
 1  light cruiser (7 × 5.5-in. main battery): 

American order of battle

Task Force 16 

Rear Admiral Thomas C. Kinkaid

Task Force 16 
Rear Admiral Kinkaid in fleet carrier Enterprise

 1  fleet carrier
  (Capt. Osborne B. Hardison)
 Air Group (Cmdr. Richard K. Gaines)
 VF-10: 34 F4F Wildcat fighters (Lt. Cmdr. James H. Flatley)
 VB-10: 14 SBD Dauntless dive bombers (Lt. Cmdr. James A. Thomas)
 VS-10: 20 SBD Dauntless scout bombers (Lt. Cmdr. James R. Lee)
 VT-10:   9 TBF Avenger torpedo bombers (Lt. Cmdr. John A. Collett†)

 Screen
 1  fast battleship (9 × 16-in. main battery): 
 Cruiser Division 4 (Rear Adm. Mahlon S. Tisdale in heavy cruiser Portland)
 1  heavy cruiser (9 × 8-in. main battery): 
 1  anti-aircraft light cruiser (16 × 5-in. main battery): 
 Destroyer Squadron 5 (Capt. Charles L. Cecil)
 1  destroyer (8 × 5-in. main battery): 
 1  destroyer (5 × 5-in. main battery): 
 Destroyer Division 10 (Cmdr. Thomas M. Stokes)
 1  destroyer (4 × 5-in. main battery):

Task Force 17 
Rear Admiral George D. Murray in fleet carrier Hornet

 1 fleet carrier
  (Capt. Charles P. Mason)
 Air Group (Cmdr. Walter F. Rodee)
 VF-72: 38 F4F Wildcat fighters (Lt. Cmdr. Henry G. Sanchez)
 VB-8:   15 SBD Dauntless dive bombers (Lt. James E. Vose)
 VS-8:   16 SBD Dauntless scout bombers (Lt. Cmdr. William J. Widhelm)
 VT-6:   15 TBF Avenger torpedo bombers (Lt. Edwin B. Parker, Jr.)

 Screen
 Cruiser Division 5 (Rear Adm. Howard H. Good) in heavy cruiser Northampton
 1  (9 × 8-in. main battery): 
 1  heavy cruiser (10 × 8-iun. main battery): 
 2  anti-aircraft light cruisers (16 × 5-in. main battery): , 
 Destroyer Squadron 2 (Cmdr. Arnold E. True)

Individual attack waves

Attack on Hornet (Nagumo carrier group first wave) 
 21 Mitsubishi A6M "Zeke" fighters (9 of which divert to attack incoming aircraft)
 21 Aichi D3A "Val" dive bombers
 22 Nakajima B5N "Kate" torpedo bombers (2 as navigational aid only)

Attack on Enterprise group (Nagumo carrier group second wave) 
   9 Mitsubishi A6M "Zeke" fighters
 19 Aichi D3A "Val" dive bombers
 16 Nakajima B5N "Kate" torpedo bombers

Jun'yo 1st wave against Enterprise group 
 12 Mitsubishi A6M "Zeke" fighters
 17 Aichi D3A "Val" dive bombers

Jun'yo 2nd wave (1 torpedo hit on towed Hornet) 
   8 Mitsubishi A6M "Zeke" fighters
   7 Nakajima B5N "Kate" torpedo bombers

Zuikaku 3rd wave (1 bomb hit on Hornet being abandoned) 
   5 Mitsubishi A6M "Zeke" fighters
   2 Aichi D3A "Val" dive bombers
   7 Nakajima B5N "Kate" torpedo bombers

Jun'yo 3rd wave (1 bomb hit on abandoned Hornet) 
   6 Mitsubishi A6M "Zeke" fighters
   4 Aichi D3A "Val" dive bombers

US first wave (Hornet): bomb hits on Shokaku, torpedo misses on Tone 
   8 F4F Wildcat fighters
 15 SBD Dauntless dive bombers (two shot down)
   6 TBF Avenger torpedo bombers

US second wave (Enterprise): 1 bomb on Chikuma, torpedo misses on Suzuya 
   8 F4F Wildcat fighters (3 shot down, 1 returned)
   3 SBD Dauntless dive bombers 
   9 TBF Avenger torpedo bombers (2 shot down, 2 returned)

US third wave (Hornet): 2 bombs, 1 torpedo on Chikuma 
   7 F4F Wildcat fighters
   9 SBD Dauntless dive bombers 
 10 TBF Avenger torpedo bombers

Notes

References

Bibliography 
 
 
 
 

Conflicts in 1942
Pacific Ocean theatre of World War II
Naval aviation operations and battles
Guadalcanal Campaign
Naval battles of World War II involving Japan
Naval battles of World War II involving the United States
October 1942 events
World War II orders of battle
United States Navy in World War II